Piz Murtaröl (also known as Cima la Casina) is a mountain of the Ortler Alps, located on the border between Italy and Switzerland. With a height of 3,180 metres above sea level, it is the highest mountain in Val Mora. On its southern side it overlooks Passo di Fraéle.

See also
List of mountains of Graubünden
List of most isolated mountains of Switzerland

References

External links
 Piz Murtaröl on Hikr

Mountains of the Alps
Alpine three-thousanders
Mountains of Switzerland
Mountains of Italy
Italy–Switzerland border
International mountains of Europe
Mountains of Graubünden
Ortler Alps
Val Müstair